Milton station is a light rail station in Milton, Massachusetts. Located in the Dorchester-Milton Lower Mills Industrial District, it serves the MBTA's Ashmont–Mattapan High-Speed Line. This station is accessible via wooden ramps on both platforms.

History 

The station originally opened in 1848 as Milton Mills, a station on the Dorchester and Milton Branch Railroad, a subsidiary of the Old Colony Railroad. The station was renamed Milton Lower Mills in 1871, and to the more distinguished Milton on February 2, 1885.

Conversion of the section between Ashmont and Mattapan to an interurban-style streetcar line by the Boston Elevated Railway began in 1926, and the segment of the Ashmont–Mattapan High Speed Line from Ashmont to Milton was opened on August 26, 1929. Milton was the terminus of the streetcar line until the remaining segment to Mattapan opened on December 21, 1929.

On March 18, 1968, the Neponset River flooded the line at Milton station after a  rainfall. Restoration work began at 6:00 am on March 21 as the waters receded; service was resumed by 4:30 pm. In June 2006, Milton station was closed for 18 months while the MBTA renovated stations on the Ashmont–Mattapan High Speed Line. Streetcar service was replaced by shuttle buses, and resumed in December 2007.

The stairs to the station from Adams Street – the only entrance not via private parking lots - have been closed since 2018 due to deteriorating condition. The MBTA has not repaired the stairs because doing so would trigger a larger accessibility renovation of the station, likely including an elevator. In August 2022, the town of Milton threatened to sue the MBTA to force repair of the stairs. The MBTA, in response, indicated it would demolish the stairs rather than repairing them. The Milton board voted in September to sue the MBTA; at that point, the MBTA intended to demolish the stairs by the end of the year. The lawsuit was filed in October 2022. In February 2023, the MBTA indicated plans to demolish the staircase on March 6–9.

References

External links

MBTA – Milton
Adams Street entrance from Google Maps Street View

Red Line (MBTA) stations
Railway stations in Norfolk County, Massachusetts
Railway stations in Boston
Railway stations in the United States opened in 1929
Stations along Old Colony Railroad lines
Milton, Massachusetts